Redcar and Cleveland is a borough with unitary authority status in North Yorkshire, England. Its main settlement is the town of Redcar. Other notable towns include South Bank, Eston, Brotton, Guisborough, Greater Eston, Loftus, Saltburn and Skelton. The borough had a population of 135,200 in 2011.

It is a part of the Tees Valley mayoralty: the current Tees Valley Mayor is Ben Houchen. The current Redcar and Cleveland Mayor is Councillor Stuart Smith. The borough is represented in Parliament by Jacob Young (Conservative Party) for the Redcar constituency, and by Simon Clarke (Conservative Party) for the Middlesbrough South and East Cleveland constituency.

History

The district was created in 1974 as the borough of Langbaurgh, one of four districts of the new non-metropolitan county of Cleveland. It was formed from the Coatham, Kirkleatham, Ormesby, Redcar and South Bank wards of the County Borough of Teesside, along with Guisborough, Loftus, Saltburn and Marske-by-the-Sea, Eston Grange and Skelton and Brotton urban districts, from the North Riding of Yorkshire. The borough was named after the ancient Langbaurgh wapentake of Yorkshire. On 1 January 1988 the borough was renamed Langbaurgh-on-Tees.

Cleveland County was abolished on 1 April 1996, with its districts becoming unitary authority areas. At this time Langbaurgh-on-Tees was renamed Redcar and Cleveland. Cleveland County was a two-tier local authority, with the county council being superior to its four districts, of which Langbaurgh-on-Tees was one. Upon becoming a unitary authority, Langbaurgh-on-Tees (renamed Redcar and Cleveland) acquired all the full rights and duties as a county, whilst retaining the same boundaries as before.

Civic Centre
Redcar and Cleveland Civic Centre is in the Leisure and Community Heart, in Redcar. The centre was opened in 2014 at a cost of £31 million. It contains civic and business facilities including a council chamber, mayor's parlour, register services, meeting rooms, 44 business units, as well as sport and leisure facilities.

It replaces the previous civic centre in Teesville, which was demolished in 2012. Civic facilities were relocated, Inspire 2 Learn, formerly the Eston City Learning Centre, also in Teesville. The Mayor's office was temporarily relocated to Kirkleatham Museum, before also moving to Redcar. The council also has offices in Redcar at Kirkleatham Street and in Guisborough.

The old town hall closure also provided an environmental boost as it was the authority's worst-performing building for carbon dioxide emissions.

Economy

This is a chart of trend of regional gross 'value added' of South Teesside at current basic prices by the Office for National Statistics with figures in millions of British Pounds Sterling.

 includes hunting and forestry

 includes energy and construction

 includes financial intermediation services indirectly measured

 Components may not sum to totals due to rounding

Local Industry

The main industry within the greater district of the town of Redcar is the Chemical Industry located close to Wilton village on the Chemical Industry Park known internationally as Wilton. The chemical companies are all members of the Northeast of England Process Industry Cluster (NEPIC).

The Wilton chemical site is owned by Singaporean utility company Sembcorp and companies operating there include SABIC who have recently built the world's largest low-density polyethylene plant (LDPE) and still operate an ethylene cracker. Lotte Chemicals are expanding both PTA and PET production. Huntsman manufacture polyurethane intermediates and Ensus have built Europe's largest bioethanol facility. Biffa Polymers now operate a polymer recycling plant that handles up to 30% of the UKs plastic milk bottles. While in support of Sembcorp, who built the UK's first wood-fired power station (Wilton 10), UK Wood Recycling Limited have a significant facility on the site providing waste wood to fuel Wilton 10.

The Teesside Steelworks operated Europe's second largest blast furnace. The majority of the steelworks (including the Redcar blast furnace, Redcar and South Bank coke ovens and the BOS plant at Lackenby) closed in 2015.

Social housing

Coast and Country Housing Limited
Coast and Country took over the ownership and management of homes from Redcar and Cleveland Borough Council in July 2002. In addition to providing core housing services the company has also invested in independent living services, including the development of a new Telecare service in partnership with the Borough Council.

Beyond Housing
In 2018, Coast and Country merged with Yorkshire Coast Homes to form Beyond Housing Limited, a Community Benefit Society with 15,000 properties across Teesside and North Yorkshire.

Local nature reserves
The council maintains a number of Local nature reserves. These are Guisborough Branch Walkway, Flatts Lane Woodland Country Park and Rosecroft Wood, Loftus Wood, Whitecliff Wood, Clarksons Wood, Errington Wood and Eston Moor.

Politics

The composition of Redcar and Cleveland Borough Council as of December 2017 is

Youth Parliament
Redcar & Cleveland Council promotes the UK Youth Parliament, a national charity which promotes democratic debate amongst its 11 - 18-year-old members.

Town twinning
Redcar and Cleveland is twinned with:
  Troisdorf, Germany, since 1990

References

External links
 Statistics about Redcar & Cleveland from the Office for National Statistics Census 2001
 Borough Council website

 
Unitary authority districts of England
Places in the Tees Valley
Local government districts of North East England
Local government districts of North Yorkshire
Boroughs in England